The Football Conference season of 2000–01 was the twenty-second season of the Football Conference, also known as the Nationwide Conference for sponsorship reasons.

Changes since the previous season
 Boston United (promoted 1999–2000)
 Chester City (relegated from the Football League 1999–2000)
 Dagenham & Redbridge (promoted 1999–2000)
 Leigh RMI (promoted 1999–2000)

Locations

Final  league table

Results

Top scorers in order of league goals

 Footballtransfers.co.uk, thefootballarchives.com and Soccerbase contain information on many playerson whom there is not yet an article in Wikipedia.
Source:

References

External links
 Official Football Conference Website
 2000–01 Conference National Results

 
National League (English football) seasons
5
English